is the name of several train stations and tram stops in Japan:

 Kenchō-mae Station (Chiba)
  Kenchō-mae Station (Ehime)
 Kenchō-mae Station (Hiroshima)
 Kenchō-mae Station (Hyōgo)
 Kenchō-mae Station (Kōchi)
 Kenchō-mae Station (Toyama)
 Kenchō-mae Station (Okinawa) → Prefectural Office Station